John Main is a Canadian politician from Arviat, Nunavut. He was elected to the Legislative Assembly of Nunavut in the 2017 general election. He represents the electoral district of Arviat North-Whale Cove.

References

Members of the Legislative Assembly of Nunavut
Living people
Year of birth missing (living people)
21st-century Canadian politicians
People from Arviat